Bernard Van de Kerckhove (8 July 1941 – 15 September 2015) was a Belgian professional road bicycle racer from 1962 to 1971. The highlights of his career were stage win in the 1964 Tour de France, which resulted in him wearing the yellow jersey for two stages. Then again in the 1965 Tour de France he won stage two and wore the jersey for one day. He would reclaim the jersey in this Tour, and wear it for two more days at the beginning of the 2nd week.

Major results

1962
Roeselare
1963
Houthulst
Omloop der Zennevalei
Koksijde
1964
Assebroek
Tour de France:
Winner stage 3A
Wearing yellow jersey for two days
Roeselare
Wingene
1965
Adinkerke
Meerbeke
Omloop der Vlaamse Ardennen
Tour de France:
Winner stage 2
Wearing yellow jersey for three days
Merelbeke
1966
Adinkerke
Stadsprijs Geraardsbergen
1967
Adinkerke
1968
Westouter
Zingem
1969
Koksijde

References

External links
 
 
 
 Official Tour de France results for Bernard Van de Kerckhove

1941 births
2015 deaths
Belgian male cyclists
Belgian Tour de France stage winners
People from Mouscron
Cyclists from Hainaut (province)